Savoldi is an Italian surname. Notable people with the surname include:

Angelo Savoldi (1914–2013), American professional wrestler and wrestling promoter
Gianluca Savoldi (born 1975), Italian footballer
Gianluigi Savoldi (1949–2008), Italian footballer
Giuseppe Savoldi (born 1947), Italian footballer
Joe Savoldi (1908–1974), Italian-born American football player and professional wrestler
Joseph Savoldi (born 1957), American professional wrestler

Italian-language surnames